Kroll & Prumni was the first wargame to be released by the Italian company International Team, in 1979. It is a hex map-based, science fiction-themed wargame, designed by Marco Donadoni, IT's chief designer, who also authored such IT best-sellers as Zargo's Lords. After IT went bankrupt in the late 1980s, the game was republished by Eurogames under title Colonisator. As with other IT titles, Kroll & Prumni is characterized by an attractive graphic design, probably due to Enea Riboldi (uncredited).

Description
Kroll & Prumni is a science fiction game for 2 players, each governing one of two factions, namely the "Kroll" and the "Prumni". The hex map of the game depicts an area of space with planets and asteroids. The opponents control a fleet of starships (including fighters, cruisers, transport ships, and mobile bases) and their goal is to colonize planets and defeat the enemy fleet. At game setup, only a small part of each fleet is deployed on the map; a relevant part of the players' strategy is in choosing when, and in which order, to deploy the other units.

References

External links
 Kroll & Prumni review (in Italian)
 Kroll & Prumni review and list of materials
 Kroll & Prumni review (in French)
 Review of Kroll & Prumni at Boardgamegeek

Wargames introduced in 1979